James B. Goudie Jr. (December 3, 1769, Fayette County, Pennsylvania – July 29, 1836, Brookville, Indiana)

James Goudie Jr., was the son of James Goudie and Rachel Liggett. James Sr. was of Northern Ireland and Rachel was of Chester County, Pennsylvania.

On October 13, 1813, he purchased  of land in Franklin County, Indiana from the Cincinnati Land Office.

Goudie owned the first grist mill in Franklin County, Indiana. He married Mary Alexander circa 1794. He owned the local newspaper "The Indiana American". They had seven children: James, Rachael, Joseph, Samuel, Elizabeth, Mary and John.
  
He was an Indiana State Representative, 2nd Session as a member of the Whig party. He rose to the position as Speaker of the lower house.

He died on 29 Jul 1836 in Brookville, Indiana. He was interred in the Holiday Cemetery, in Franklin County, Indiana.

1769 births
1836 deaths
Members of the Indiana House of Representatives
People from Fayette County, Pennsylvania
People from Franklin County, Indiana
Indiana Whigs
19th-century American politicians